Lady P may refer to:
 Pilar Diaz, lead singer of American alternative rock band Los Abandoned
 Pauline Pearce, jazz singer and subject of the 2011 viral video Heroine of Hackney